Vandamme is a surname. Notable people with the surname include:

Alexandre Vandamme (born 1962), Belgian businessman
Dominique Vandamme (1770–1830), French military officer
George Vandamme, Belgian wheelchair racer
Jamaïque Vandamme (born 1985), Belgian footballer
Michel Vandamme (1930–2019), French swimmer
Virginie Vandamme (born 1966), French sprint canoeist

Surnames of Belgian origin
Dutch-language surnames